Margaret Garrard Warner (born February 12, 1950) is a senior correspondent for The PBS NewsHour.  Before joining the NewsHour in 1993, she was a reporter for The Wall Street Journal, The San Diego Union-Tribune, the Concord Monitor, and Newsweek.

In addition, Warner has appeared on PBS' Washington Week In Review and CNN's The Capital Gang and was co-host of the radio program America Abroad, which focused on international issues.

Education and personal life 
Margaret Warner is the daughter of Brainard Henry Warner III and Mildred Warner of Chevy Chase, Maryland. She is a graduate of the Holton-Arms School of Bethesda, Maryland, and graduated from Yale University with a BA, cum laude, in English in 1971.  Her father was a partner in the Washington law firm of Ogilby, Huhn & Barr. Her mother, Mildred Warner, was a trustee of the Corcoran Gallery of Art in Washington.

Warner is a great-granddaughter of the founder of the Washington Loan and Trust Company, which was consolidated into the Riggs National Bank.

She was married to former Chairman of the Federal Trade Commission, John R. Reilly, until his death in October 2008.

Career

During the 1980s and 1990s, Warner worker as a reporter for Newsweek magazine.

Since 2006, Warner has compiled on-the-ground reports for the PBS NewsHour. Much of her reporting is low-budget and covers civil liberties and politics in South Asia, China and Russia. Between 2009 and 2013, she was one of the program's rotating group of co-anchors.

She is a member of the Council on Foreign Relations, a trustee of the Virginia Foundation for Independent Colleges, and she serves on the President's Council on International Activities at Yale University.

Awards and honors 
 2008. Warner won an Emmy Award for her coverage of the turmoil in Pakistan and the Edward Weintal Prize for International Reporting from Georgetown University's Institute for the Study of Diplomacy for her overseas reporting
 1990. Her diplomatic coverage for Newsweek during the Gulf War made her runner-up for the National Press Club's 1990 Edwin M. Hood Award for Diplomatic Reporting.
 She also shared, with a Newsweek team, the prestigious George Polk Award for coverage of terrorism, and the Best Reporting Award from the Overseas Press Club.

References

External links

Profile at PBS NewsHour
blog entries at The Rundown

Margaret Warner at the American Program Bureau

American Episcopalians
Yale College alumni
Newsweek people
American women television journalists
Concord Monitor people
The Wall Street Journal people
Living people
1950 births
PBS people
20th-century American journalists
21st-century American journalists
20th-century American women
21st-century American women